Tilesia is a genus of flowering plants in the family Asteraceae. Species in the genus Tilesia are found in Cuba and South America.

 Species
 Tilesia baccata (L.) Pruski - South America from Venezuela to Paraguay
 Tilesia macrocephala (H.Rob.) Pruski - Colombia, Ecuador, western Venezuela
 Tilesia spilanthoides Griseb. - Cuba

 formerly included
see Wulffia 
 Tilesia rubens - Wulffia rubens

References

Heliantheae
Asteraceae genera